Abdul Ghafoor Bhurgri (January 1921 - 10 February 2015), was a lawyer, writer and politician from Larkana, Pakistan.

Early life
Abdul Ghafoor Bhurgri was born on 1 January 1921, in the village of Ghulam Nabi Bhurgri, Shahdadkot. His father, Abdul Jalil Bhurgri, was a government employee and also practiced agriculture.

Education
Bhurgri received primary education in Shahdadkot and matriculated from Madrassah High School, Larkana. After graduating from C & S College, Shikarpur, affiliated with Bombay University, he attended the Aligarh Muslim University He gained his LLB and Masters in the Persian language between 1942 and 1946.

Professional life

His students included former Chief Justice of Pakistan Rana Bhagwandas, former Law Secretary Parkash Lal, Muhammad Bachal tunio, Abdul Hamid Bhurgri (Additional Advocate General High Court Larkano).

Journalism
He sometimes wrote for the newspaper Insaf.

Political career

In his student life, he joined the Muslim league, as a true soldier of Quaid-e-Azam Mohammad Ali Jinnah.
He started his political career at C & S College Shikarpur then Bombay University, by forming of Muslim Student federation and then became its president.
He was amongst the freedom fighters from his early life.

He started his political career from Muslim league and had his political affiliation with Muslim league leader & former Chief Minister Sindh Qazi Fazlullah Ubaidullah & Bhurgri also developed association with former Chief Minister Muhammad Ayub Khuhro in Khuhro's last days.

He not only took part in politics from the platform of the Muslim League, but also devoted his time to literary activities under the flag of Jamaat Shoara-i-Sindh and played a key role in organizing literary conferences in Larkana.

In 1953, at the age of 32, he became the first elected president of the Larkana Municipal Committee .

In 1976 he joined the Pakistan Peoples Party, soon after joining the party he was appointed as Deputy General Secretary Sindh. In 1977 he was elected unopposed from PS-31 (Shahdadkot Taluka).

Bhurgri was imprisoned five times during 1978 and 1987.

He represented Pakistan in the United Nations in 1983 and 1995.

In 1984 he became minister for revenue and culture for Sindh

Literary contribution
Zindagi Jo Safar ( زندگئ جو سفر) is a Sindhi language book on Sufism through poetry of Shah Abdul Latif Bhitai, Rumi and Muhammad Iqbal.
Published by Shah Abdul Latif Bhitai Chair, University of Karachi, 
Saath Dhanri Sarwaarn (ساٿ ڌ ڻئ سرواڻ)  is a Sindhi language book on the life of Quaid-e-Azam Muhammad Ali Jinnah.
 Zulfikar Ali Bhutto: The Falcon of Pakistan, book published by SZABIST, fore-worded by Former Prime Minister Mohtarma Benazir Bhutto, the book describes the life of Zulfiqar Ali Bhutto
Guzri Jay Waya, Say Zamana Yaad Paya, (گزئ جئ وئا، سئ زمانا ياد پيا) is the Sindhi language autobiography of Abdul Ghafoor Bhurgri.

Death
He died on 10 February 2015 at his home in Larkana, aged 94. The funeral prayers were led by Sayyid Ghulam Hussain Shah Bukhari of Dargah Hussainabad (Kamber). In tribute, work at the high court and lower courts of Larkana temporarily ceased.

See also
Bhurgri
Larkana
List of Sindhi people
Abdul-Majid Bhurgri

External links
 Bhurgri Website
 Zulfikar-Ali-Bhutto-The-Falcon-of-Pakistan

See also
 Article by Abdul Aziz Bhurgri
Article by Dawn News
 Article by Indus News

References

Sindhi people
People from Sindh
1921 births
2015 deaths
Sindh MPAs 1977
Writers from Sindh
Sindhi-language writers
Aligarh Muslim University alumni
Faculty of Law, Aligarh Muslim University alumni
People from Lahore